Murari Prasad Gautam is an Indian politician from Bihar currently serving as Minister of Panchayati Raj & Member of Legislative Assembly in Bihar Legislative Assembly representing Chenari constituency.

References

Bihar MLAs 2005–2010
Bihar MLAs 2020–2025
Indian National Congress politicians from Bihar
1980 births
Living people
People from Rohtas district